Maefai is a surname. Notable people with the surname include:

 Charles Maefai (died 2019), Solomon Islands politician
 Lillian Maefai, Solomon Islands politician

Surnames of Oceanian origin